Nebria psammodes is a species of ground beetle in the Nebriinae subfamily.

Description
Body is black, while the head, the thorax and the outer edge of the elytra are tawny.

Distribution
These beetles are present in Croatia, France, Italy, Slovenia, Switzerland, and the island of Sicily. They can be found on the banks of small alpine streams.

References

psammodes
Beetles of Europe
Beetles described in 1792
Taxa named by Pietro Rossi